World Assistance for Cambodia (known before 2012 as American Assistance for Cambodia) is a non-profit organization founded in 1993, by Bernard Krisher aimed at giving hope to the Cambodian people following the extermination of 2 million Cambodians during the Khmer Rouge genocide.

History and Philosophy
In 2012, the organization has been renamed World Assistance for Cambodia. It uses cambodiaschools.com which it jointly operates with its Japanese sister organization Japan Relief for Cambodia. From the mission statement on its website: "World Assistance for Cambodia (WAfC)/Japan Relief for Cambodia (JRfC) are independent nonprofit organizations dedicated to providing opportunities for the youth and rural poor in Cambodia. World Assistance for Cambodia is registered in the United States as a 501(c) (3) tax-deductible nonprofit organization. Within Cambodia, WAfC / JRfC is recognized by the Cambodian government as one nonprofit organization."

The founder's own survival of the Nazi holocaust as well as the American bombardment of Cambodia during the Vietnam War are noted as motivating factors for founding and running the organizations.

The organization maintains a host of programs and projects in Cambodia

Programs

Rural Schools Program
This program builds rural schools. Founding schemes allow founding new school or adopting an existing schools and enhancing them with computer training, English lessons, as well as vegetable gardens and other features

Girls Be Ambitious
This program is designed to enable girls who are prevented to go attend school due to poverty to attend one of the rural schools and receive an education instead of having to work in the fields, or for the family.

Bright Future Kids
Bright Future Kids is a sponsorship program for academically-talented student from the poorest rural areas of Cambodia.

A New Life Orphanage
This program matches foster parents to orphans who have lost their parents to HIV/AIDS.

Village Leap
Village Leap addresses issues of poverty, isolation, health hazards and limited educational and commercial opportunities in small remote villages in Cambodia.

References

Cambodia–United States relations
Charities based in New York (state)
Foreign charities operating in Cambodia